The Professional College of Engineers and Land Surveyors of Puerto Rico — (CIAPR)— is the association mandated by law that groups all professionals that call, present, or represent themselves as "engineers" or "land surveyors" in Puerto Rico. As with many other countries, the profession of engineering and land surveying is both regulated and licensed in Puerto Rico; while another entity, namely the Puerto Rico Examining Board of Engineers and Land Surveyors, regulates the profession and emits its corresponding licenses, the Puerto Rico Annotated Codes and Act 173 of 1988 requires that all licensed engineers and land surveyors in Puerto Rico be members of the College. The quasi-public nonprofit corporation was established on May 15, 1938, through Act 319 of 1938 in order to bring together professionals with the right to practice engineering, architecture, and surveying in Puerto Rico.

The primary mission of the Professional College is to promote the protection and development of engineering and surveying to promote ethics and excellence in professional practice for the benefit of referees and the people of Puerto Rico.

Organizational structure
The Professional College is composed primarily of its governing board, which in turn is composed of the presidents and delegates elected by the enrollment of the schools in their respective annual meetings, and delegates elected by their chapters are registered for their assemblies year. Also part of the governing board are the president, a vice-president for engineering and a vice-president for surveyors, elected at the annual meeting.
The professional college institutes are semi-autonomous bodies, which represent the various professional bodies board of government or publicly.ico.
In addition to these agencies, the Professional College has about twenty permanent committees and ad hoc committees designated for specific projects.
The college also has an independent disciplinary tribunal that is used in cases of violations of professional conduct or ethics, or disputes between colleges.

Former presidents of CIAPR
The following have served as presidents of the CIAPR:

 1938-1940 Engineer / Architect Etienne Totti-Torres - First President of CIAAPR, Worcester Polytechnic Institute.
 1940-1942 Eng. Manuel Font Jimenez - Civil Engineer and Health, Massachusetts Institute of Technology
 1942-1944 Eng. Juan G. Figueroa - Civil Engineer, CAAM.
 1944-1946 Eng. Arturo Romaguera - Mechanical Engineer, Cornell University.
 1946-1948 Eng. Gustavo E. Padilla - Civil Engineer, lawyer, appraiser and artist, CAAM, University of Michigan.
 1948-1950 Eng. Orlando R. Mendez - Civil Engineer, University of Michigan.
 1950-1952 Eng. Cesar Cordero-Davila, Civil Engineer, CAAM, Adjutant General of the PR National Guard
 1952-1953 Eng. Gustavo E. Padilla - Civil Engineer and lawyer, University of Michigan.
 1953-1955 Eng. Salvador V. Caro Costa - Civil and Mechanical Engineer, CAAM.
 1955-1957 Eng. Jose Luis Capacete  - Civil Engineer, Dayton and Illinois Institute of Technology
 1957-1959 Eng. Rafael V. Urrutia García - Civil Engineer, CAAM Executive Director Electricity Authority.
 1959-1960 Eng. Gustavo E. Padilla - Civil Engineer and lawyer, University of Michigan.
 1960-1962 Eng. Rafael Doménech - Civil Engineer, CAAM.
 1962-1964 Arch. Horacio Diaz - Architect, Tulane University.
 1964-1966 Eng. Antonio Cajigas Flames - Civil Engineer and lawyer, CAAM.
 1966-1968 Eng. Manuel A. Kortright - Civil Engineer and lawyer, CAAM.
 1968-1970 Eng. Victor Manuel García Saldaña - Electrical engineer, CAAM, electrical and mechanical engineering consultant.
 1970-1972 Eng. Dennis W. Hernandez-Santiago - Civil Engineer, CAAM and MIT, Secretary of Transportation and Public Works.
 1972-1974 Eng. Rafael Lopez Vega -Electrical Engineer, CAAM
 1974-1976 Eng. Jose Francisco Quinonez-Soto - Civil Engineer, CAAM.
 1976-1978 Eng. Rafael Davila-Siaca - Civil Engineer, CAAM, Univ. of Illinois.
 1978-1980 Eng. Joseph E. Custodio Planel - Mechanical Engineer, CAAM.
 1980-1982 Eng. Jose A. Ojeda Ortiz - Civil Engineer, CAAM.
 1982-1984 Eng. Gilberto Delgado Toledo - Mechanical Engineer, CAAM.
 1984-1985 Eng. Patria G. Custodio Planel - Industrial Engineer, CAAM, Chairwoman of the PR Planning Board.
 1985-1987 Eng. Enrique Ruiz Miranda - Civil Engineer, CAAM.
 1987-1988 Eng. Alberto Sanchez Brignoni - Electrical Engineer, CAAM.
 1988-1989 Eng. Jairo Lascarro PhD - Mechanical Engineer, CAAM, Drexel University, University of Miami.
 1989-1990 Eng. Samuel Rosario Santos - Mechanical Engineer, CAAM., 1989-May 1990
 1990-1992 Eng. Michael A. Roa Vargas - Civil Engineer, CAAM.
 1992-1994 Eng. Jose Ramiro Rodriguez - Chemical Engineer, CAAM
 1994-1996 Eng. José M. Izquierdo-Encarnación - Civil Engineer, CAAM, Secretary of Transportation and Public Works, Secretary of State of Puerto Rico.
 1996-1998 Eng. Elliot Merced Montanes - Civil Engineer and lawyer, CAAM.
 1998-2000 Eng. Orlando Guihurt Slim - Mechanical Engineer, CAAM.
 2000-2002 Eng. Ivan Nicolau-Nin - Chemical Engineer, CAAM.
 2002-2004 Surveyor Israel Otero Rosario - Surveyor, Member of the Puerto Rico House of Representatives
 2004-2006 Eng. Robert L. Rexach Cintron - Civil Engineer, University of Massachusetts.
 2006-2007 Eng. John A. Pérez González - Chemical Engineer, CAAM.
 2007-2008 Eng. Antonio E. Medina Delgado - Mechanical Engineer, CAAM.
 2009-2011 Eng. Miguel A. Torres Diaz, MEM - Civil Engineer, Master in Engineering Management, Universidad Politecnica de PR

Institutes
The CIAPR has eight Institutes:

 Institute of Surveyors.
 Institute of Environmental Engineers.
 Institute of Civil Engineers.
 Institute of Computer Engineers.
 Institute of Electrical Engineers.
 Institute of Industrial Engineers.
 Institute of Mechanical Engineers.
 Institute of Chemical Engineers.

Chapters
The CIAPR has eleven Regional Chapters:

 Aguadilla Chapter
 Arecibo Chapter
 Bayamon Chapter
 Carolina Chapter
 Guayama Chapter
 Humacao Chapter
 Ponce Chapter
 San Juan Chapter
 Mainland Chapter (Headquarters in Florida)

Notes

References

 Commission CIAPR History (2008). "1938-2008 70 Years of History".
 Chapter of Bayamon, Gold Book, College, Fiftieth Anniversary 1957-2007, Bayamón, 2007
 Chapter of Ponce, Ponce Chapter House, College, 30th. Anniversary, November 1994,
 World news magazines Tecnomundo College and College of Engineers and Surveyors of Puerto Rico, San Juan (1940–2007)

External links
 CIAPR Portal
 Colegio de Ingenieros y Agrimensores de Puerto Rico, August 5, 2010 

Engineering education
Professional associations based in Puerto Rico